J-Roc is a hip hop and R&B music producer.

J-Roc may also refer to:
 J-Roc, a character from the Canadian television series Trailer Park Boys
 JROC, Joint Requirements Oversight Council

See also
J-Rock (disambiguation)